Beaver County is a county in west central Utah, United States. As of the 2020 United States Census, the population was 7,072, up from the 2010 figure of 6,629. Its county seat and largest city is Beaver. The county was named for the abundance of beaver in the area.

History
Explorers of European descent first visited present-day Beaver County in the 1776 Domínguez-Escalante Expedition. The proposed territory of Deseret (soon changed to Utah Territory) began with the arrival of Mormon pioneers in 1847. After the immediate Great Salt Lake City area was settled, settlers moved into more outlying areas, including the future Beaver County area. The county was created by the Utah territorial legislature from a section of Iron County on January 5, 1856, before the settlement of Beaver town was founded later that year. The county was named for the animal, which was plentiful there. The county boundary as delineated by that act included areas in present-day Colorado and Nevada. The defined boundary was altered on January 16, 1861, by the creation of two counties in present Nevada. The county area was effectively reduced on February 28, 1861, by the US Congress when it created Colorado Territory, taking all of the Beaver County areas east of 109 degrees longitude. The county's boundary was enlarged on January 17, 1861, by the addition of parcels from Millard, Sanpete, and St. Mary's counties. However, its west area was reduced by the creation of the Nevada Territory on July 14, 1862 (this adjustment was altered on May 5, 1866, by the action of the US Congress, effectively ceding all Beaver County area west of 114 degrees longitude to Nevada counties). The county area was also reduced on January 16, 1865, when Piute County was created from Beaver territory.

A quarter of the county's workers are employed by hog processor Smithfield Foods.

Geography

Beaver County lies on the west side of Utah. Its west border abuts the east border of the state of Nevada. The west part of the county consists of low rolling hills punctuated by isolated mountains. The east edge of the county runs to the crest of a north–south-running mountain ridge. The terrain slopes to the west and north; its highest point is a mountain crest on its east border, at 12,011' (3661m) ASL.

To the west, barren desert valleys typify the scenery, separated by mountains lightly forested with junipers.

Adjacent counties

 Lincoln County, Nevada - west
 Millard County - north
 Sevier County - northeast
 Piute County - east
 Garfield County - southeast
 Iron County - south

Protected areas
 Fishlake National Forest (part)
 Indian Peak State Game Management Area
 Minersville National Forest (part)

Demographics

As of the 2010 United States Census, there were 6,629 people, 2,265 households, and 1,697 families in the county. The population density was 2.56/sqmi (0.99/km2). There were 2,908 housing units at an average density of 1.12/sqmi (0.43/km2). The racial makeup of the county was 89.0% white, 1.1% Asian, 1.1% American Indian, 0.3% Pacific islander, 0.2% black or African American, 6.9% from other races, and 1.4% from two or more races. Those of Hispanic or Latino origin made up 10.8% of the population. In terms of ancestry, 35.2% were English, 15.5% were German, 10.6% were Irish, 6.8% were Scottish, and 2.3% were American.

Of the 2,265 households, 41.8% had children under 18 living with them, 63.2% were married couples living together, 7.2% had a female householder with no husband present, 25.1% were non-families, and 22.1% of all households were made up of individuals. The average household size was 2.92, and the average family size was 3.44. The median age was 31.9 years.

The median income for a household in the county was $41,514, and the median income for a family was $46,426. Males had a median income of $40,167 versus $26,215 for females. The per capita income for the county was $16,131. About 12.6% of families and 17.9% of the population were below the poverty line, including 25.1% of those under age 18 and 15.3% of those age 65 or over.

Politics and overnment
Beaver County voters have traditionally voted Republican. In no national election since 1964 has the county selected the Democratic Party candidate.

Communities

Cities
 Beaver (county seat)
 Milford

Towns
 Minersville

Unincorporated communities
 Adamsville
 Cook Corner
 Greenville
 Manderfield
 North Creek

Former communities
 Arago City
 Blueacre
 Cunningham Hill
 Frisco
 Lincoln
 Murdock
 Newhouse
 Shauntie
 Shenandoah City
 Smyths
 Sulphurdale
 Three Creeks
 Upton
 Yellow Banks

Recreation
 The American Discovery Trail traverses the county running through both Beaver and Milford.
 Elk Mountain is home to the Eagle Point Ski area.
 Rock Corral Recreation Area, an area of geologic interest managed by the BLM

See also
 
 List of counties in Utah
 National Register of Historic Places listings in Beaver County, Utah

References
Specific

General

External links

 

 
1856 establishments in Utah Territory
Populated places established in 1856